Iruvar is a 2016 Singaporean-Tamil-language mystery soap opera starring Indra, Gayathri Segaran, Vishnu, Varman, Jabu and Balakumaran. The first one-hour episode was aired on December 11, 2016. It replaced Azhagiya Thamizh Magal and it broadcast on MediaCorp Vasantham from December 11, 2016, to 29 March 2017 for 62 episodes. The show's final one-hour episode aired Wednesday 29 March 2017.

Plot
What happens when the line between real and reel life gets blurred? What starts off as a mere story for writer Sahana slowly turns into a journey that takes over her life. A journey where the destination beholds a shocking revelation.

Cast

Main cast
 Indra Chandran as Sahana
 Gayathri Segaran as Bhairavi
 Vishnu M. Anandh as Nandha
 Varman Chandramohan as Amaren
 Jabu Deen Faruk as Akhilan
 Balakumaran

Supporting cast
 Lingam Muthusamy as Prathap
 Dhivya Raveen as Nivedha
 Jamuna Rani as Sahana's mother
 Gunaseelan as Bhairavi’s Father 
 Samantha Kalaivani as Bhairavi's Stepmother
 Kalaiyarasi
 Chitra
 Hari Prashandth as Boy
 Manimala Logan
 Vimala Velu as Nirmala
 Vikneswary Se as Radha

Production
The drama was written and directed by  Raja Tamilmaran, screenplay by Kumaran Sundaram and Nalan Apana, Dialogue and producer by Raja Tamilmaran.

Original soundtrack

Background Score
Composed by Vicknesh Saravanan.

Title song
Composed by Vicknesh Saravanan and written by Jaya Rathakrishnan, sung by Kasthuri and Saravanan.

Soundtrack

References

External links 
 Vasantham Official Website

Tamil-language romance television series
Tamil-language fantasy television series
Tamil-language mystery television series
Singapore Tamil dramas
2016 Tamil-language television series debuts
Vasantham TV original programming
Tamil-language television shows in Singapore
2017 Tamil-language television series endings